The 2021 Donostia San Sebastian Klasikoa was a road cycling one-day race that took place on 31 July in San Sebastián, Spain. It was the second women's edition of the Clásica de San Sebastián. 

The 139.8km route covered four categorised climbs, including the Jaizkibel around the 90km mark, a tough steep climb which has often played a pivotal role in deciding the men's race.

Teams
Eighteen teams, each with a maximum of six riders, started the race:

UCI Women's WorldTeams

 
 
 
 
 
 

UCI Women's Continental Teams

 
 
 
 
 
 
 
 
 
 Women Cycling Sport
 Team Farto-BTC
 Laboral Kutxa-Fundacion Euskadi

Results

See also
 2021 in women's road cycling

External links

References

 
2021 UCI Women's World Tour
2021 in Spanish road cycling
July 2021 sports events in Spain